Fairview is an unincorporated community in Tillamook County, Oregon, United States.

Fairview Grange

History 
Fairview Grange - located by the Tillamook County Fairgrounds on 3rd street - was founded in 1895 as the 273rd Grange organized in the nation, and the first Tillamook County. The hall itself was constructed in 1916, costing $2,000 USD at the time ($ USD today, when adjusted for inflation).

Restoration 
The Grange hall gradually fell into a state of disrepair and was to be demolished in 2014 before members of Oregon's State Government intervened. Following this, renovations began late in 2021 and are set to continue until the summer of 2022.

References

Unincorporated communities in Tillamook County, Oregon
Unincorporated communities in Oregon